is a city located in Yamanashi Prefecture, Japan. ,  the city had an estimated population of 48,782 in 19,806 households and a population density of 400 persons per km2.

Geography
Fujiyoshida lies at the northern base of Mount Fuji, and is built upon old lava flows. It is considered a high-elevation city in Japan, at 650 to 850 metres (2,140 to 2,800 feet) above sea level. The city is also located between two of the Fuji Five Lakes. The Katsura River flows through the eastern part of the city.

Neighboring municipalities
Yamanashi Prefecture
Tsuru
Minamitsuru District: Nishikatsura, Oshino, Yamanakako, Narusawa, Fujikawaguchiko
Shizuoka Prefecture
Fujinomiya
Suntō District: Oyama

Climate
The city has a climate characterized by hot and humid summers, and relatively mild winters (Köppen climate classification Cfa).

Demographics
Per Japanese census data, the population of Fujiyoshida has declined in recent decades.

History
Following the Meiji restoration, the area around Fujiyoshida was organized into Minamitsuru District, Yamanashi per the cadastral reforms of July 22, 1878. With the establishment of the modern municipalities system on July 1, 1889, the villages of Mizuho, Akemi and Fukuchi were established. In 1939, Mizuho was raised to town status and renamed Shimoyoshida. Likewise, in 1947, Fukuchi was raised to town status and renamed Fujikamiyoshida and Akemi was raised to town status in 1948, retaining its original name. These three towns merged on March 20, 1951, to form the city of Fujiyoshida.

Government
Fujiyoshida has a mayor-council form of government with a directly elected mayor and a unicameral city legislature of 20 members.

Economy
For several centuries, artisans around the Fujiyoshida area have produced high quality textiles, and now the city is the center of commerce and high technology in southern Yamanashi Prefecture.

Education
Showa University
Fujiyoshida has seven public elementary schools and four public middle schools operated by the city government, and three public private high schools operated by the Yamanashi Prefectural Board of Education. The city also has one private middle school and one private high school.

Senior high schools 
In Japan the public Senior High Schools are operated by the prefecture, which in this case in the Yamanashi prefecture. While not compulsory, 94% of all junior high school graduates entered high schools. These high schools are the equivalent of grades 10 – 12 in the United States or the Fifth and Sixth form in the English system.

Prefectural Public High Schools 
 Yoshida High School
 Fuji Hokuryo High School
 Hibarigaoka High School

Private High Schools 
 Fuji Gakuen High School

Junior high schools 
The public Junior High Schools are operated by the City of Fujiyoshida.  These schools are the equivalent of grades 6 – 9 in the United States or the First to Forth form in the English system.

Municipal Junior High Schools 
 Shimoyoshida Junior High School 
 Akemi Junior High School 
 Yoshida Junior High School 
 Fujimidai Junior High School

Private Junior High Schools 
 Fuji Gakuen Junior High School

Primary schools 
The public Primary Schools are operated by the City of Fujiyoshida.
Municipal Primary Schools
 Shimoyoshida Daiichi Elementary School 
 Shimoyoshida 2nd Elementary School 
 Shimoyoshida Higashi Elementary School 
 Akemi Elementary School 
 Yoshida Elementary School 
 Yoshida Nishi Elementary School 
 Fuji Elementary School

Transportation

Railway
 Fuji Kyuko - Fujikyuko Line
  -  -  -  -

Highway
  Chūō Expressway
 Higashifuji-goko Road

Sister cities
 Colorado Springs, Colorado, United States, since 1962
 Chamonix-Mont Blanc, France, since 1978

Local attractions

Kitaguchi Hongū Fuji Sengen Jinja, a Shinto shrine dedicated to the kami of Mount Fuji, the Kitaguchi Hongū Fuji Sengen Jinja is the historical starting point for pilgrims climbing the mountain. The main structure was originally built in 788 and underwent reconstruction in the 17th century. Additional buildings include a shrine dedicated to Takeda Shingen (1521–1573), and a red torii which is taken down and rebuilt every "Fuji Year" (60 years). The shrine has a local history museum which displays items from Fujiyoshida's past including household items, farm implements, clothing and samples of the cities' famous textiles.
Fuji-Q Highland an amusement park with a variety of attractions suitable for adults and children.
Mt. Fuji Visitors Center. It is home to interactive displays, videos, books and guides about Mount Fuji.
Mt. Fuji Radar Dome Museum. A tribute to the meteorologists who built a radar research facility at the summit of Mount Fuji, which features a room which simulates the conditions at the summit of the mountain.
Arakurayama Sengen Park and the Chūrei-tō pagoda, built on a hilltop facing Mount Fuji.

Notable people from Fujiyoshida
Keiji Mutoh, professional wrestler
Shun Sugata, actor

References

External links

  
Official Website 

 
Cities in Yamanashi Prefecture